Void Bastards is a science-fiction first-person shooter and roguelike video game developed by Australian studio Blue Manchu and published by Humble Bundle. It was released on May 28, 2019, for Microsoft Windows and Xbox One. Ports of the game for Nintendo Switch and PlayStation 4 were released on May 7, 2020. The game revolves around surviving in the dangerous Sargasso Nebula by boarding and salvaging materials from spaceships. It received generally positive reviews from critics, who praised its comic-book art style, dark humor, and gameplay, but criticized its lackluster story and replay value.

Plot 
The main character is one of many rehydrated prisoners aboard a stranded personnel vessel, whose AI must rely on its dangerous cargo to obtain fuel for a final jump to its destination.

Gameplay 
The game revolves around a procedurally generated structure, in which the player enters other ships, fights enemies and salvages materials to repair their own ship. If the player dies, they are replaced by another "rehydrated" prisoner. When a prisoner dies, the player loses all ammunition, fuel and food, but keeps weapon and gadget upgrades as well as objective progress.

Development 
The game was inspired by System Shock 2 and BioShock.

Reception 

Void Bastards received "generally favorable reviews" according to Metacritic. Cosmin Vasile of Softpedia rated the game 8.5/10, calling it an "absolute delight" due to its comic-book aesthetics and "solid", "addictive" gameplay, but also called it "repetitive" with a "weak story". Alessandro Barbossa of GameSpot rated the game 8/10, also praising the art style and "ridiculously designed" but "satisfying" weapons. Samuel Roberts of PC Gamer rated it 71/100, calling the game "slightly messy" but praising its "gorgeous" art style and "excellent" weapons.

Accolades 
The game was nominated for "Xbox Game of the Year" at the 2019 Golden Joystick Awards, and for "Excellence in Visual Art" at the Independent Games Festival Awards.

References 

2019 video games
First-person shooters
Humble Games games
Indie video games
Nintendo Switch games
PlayStation 4 games
Roguelike video games
Science fiction video games
Single-player video games
Video games developed in Australia
Video games using procedural generation
Windows games
Xbox Cloud Gaming games
Xbox One games